Ruggiero is an Italian spelling variant of the name Ruggero, a version of the Germanic name Roger, and may refer to:

As a surname
Adamo Ruggiero (born 1986), Canadian actor
Angela Ruggiero (born 1980), American hockey player
Angelo Ruggiero (1940–1989), Member of the New York City Mafia
Benjamin Ruggiero (1926–1994), member of the New York City Mafia
Deb Ruggiero (born 1958), radio personality and politician from Rhode Island
Giuseppe Ruggiero (born 1993) Italian footballer
Joseph S. Ruggiero, better known under his stage name Joey Powers (1934–2017), American singer and songwriter
Paolo Ruggiero (born 1957), Italian general and member of NATO supreme command
Renato Ruggiero (1930–2013), Italian politician
Richard S. Ruggiero (1944–2014), New York politician
Salvatore Ruggiero (1945–1982), New York City Mafia associate and older brother of Angelo Ruggiero
Vic Ruggiero, musician and songwriter from New York City

As a given name
Ruggiero (character), character in Ludovico Ariosto's Orlando furioso
Roger of Lauria, in Italian known as Ruggero or Ruggiero di Lauria (1245–1305), Italian admiral who was commander of the fleet of Aragon
Ruggiero Giovannelli (1560–1625), Italian composer of the Renaissance and Baroque eras
Ruggiero Leoncavallo (1857–1919), Italian opera composer 
Ruggiero Ricci (1918–2012), Italian-American violin virtuoso
Ruggiero Rizzitelli (b. 1967), Italian football who played in Germany

Other
Torre di Ruggiero, a comune and town in the province of Catanzaro in the Calabria region of Italy
Ruggiero (music), a musical scheme which is at times harmonic and at times melodic
La liberazione di Ruggiero, a 1625 comic opera by Francesca Caccini
Ruggiero, an opera by Johann Adolf Hasse (1771)
Ruggiero, a character in the opera Alcina of Georg Friedrich Händel.

See also
Ruggero

Italian masculine given names
Italian-language surnames